Orgeyevsky Uyezd (Оргеевский уезд) was one of the subdivisions of the Bessarabia Governorate of the Russian Empire. It was situated in the central part of the governorate. Its administrative centre was Orhei.

Demographics
At the time of the Russian Empire Census of 1897, Orgeyevsky Uyezd had a population of 213,478. Of these, 77.9% spoke Romanian, 12.5% Yiddish, 5.7% Ukrainian, 2.7% Russian, 0.8% Romani, 0.3% Polish, 0.1% German, 0.1% Armenian and 0.1% Greek as their native language.

References

 
Uezds of Bessarabia Governorate
Bessarabia Governorate